The Xpert MTB/RIF is a cartridge-based nucleic acid amplification test (NAAT) for simultaneous rapid tuberculosis diagnosis and rapid antibiotic sensitivity test. It is an automated diagnostic test that can identify Mycobacterium tuberculosis (MTB) DNA and resistance to rifampicin (RIF). It was co-developed by the laboratory of Professor David Alland at the University of Medicine and Dentistry of New Jersey (UMDNJ), Cepheid Inc. and Foundation for Innovative New Diagnostics, with additional financial support from the US National Institutes of Health (NIH).

In December 2010, the World Health Organization (WHO) endorsed the Xpert MTB/RIF for use in tuberculosis (TB) endemic countries. The announcement followed 18 months assessing its field effectiveness in TB, MDR-TB, and TB/HIV co-infection.
The test may enable the diagnosis of TB in patients likely to be missed by traditional tests.

According to the Centers for Disease Control and Prevention (CDC) in 2015, the Xpert MTB/RIF test was "revolutionizing TB control by contributing to the rapid diagnosis of TB disease and drug resistance. The test simultaneously detects Mycobacterium tuberculosis complex (MTBC) and resistance to rifampin (RIF) in less than 2 hours. In comparison, standard cultures can take 2 to 6 weeks for MTBC to grow and conventional drug resistance tests can add 3 more weeks."

Description
The Xpert MTB/RIF detects DNA sequences specific for Mycobacterium tuberculosis and rifampicin resistance by polymerase chain reaction. It is based on the Cepheid GeneXpert system, a rapid, simple-to-use nucleic acid amplification test (NAAT). The Xpert® MTB/RIF purifies and concentrates Mycobacterium tuberculosis bacilli from sputum samples, isolates genomic material from the captured bacteria by sonication and subsequently amplifies the genomic DNA by PCR. The process identifies most of the clinically relevant Rifampicin resistance inducing mutations in the RNA polymerase beta (rpoB) gene in the Mycobacterium tuberculosis genome in a real time format using fluorescent probes called molecular beacons. Results are obtained from unprocessed sputum samples in 90 minutes, with minimal biohazard and very little technical training required to operate. This test was developed as an on-demand near patient technology which could be performed even in a doctor's office if necessary.

A review to assess the diagnostic accuracy of Xpert TB found that when used as an initial test to replace smear microscopy it had pooled sensitivity of 89% and specificity of 99% . However, when Xpert TB was used as an add-on for cases of negative smear microscopy the sensitivity was only 67% and specificity 99%. In a clinical study conducted the sensitivity of the MTB/RIF test on just 1 sputum sample was 92.2% for culture-positive TB; 98.2% for smear+ and culture-positive cases; and 72.5% for smear-negative, culture-positive cases, with a specificity of 99.2%. Sensitivity and higher specificity were slightly higher when 3 samples were tested.

Cost

Some concerns have been raised about the Xpert MTB/RIF, including minor operational issues and cost. The concessional price for a GeneXpert system is currently 32,000 USD for a four module instrument. As of 6 August 2012, the cost of a test cartridge in countries eligible for concessional pricing is $9.98 USD.
 As of 30 June 2013, 1,402 GeneXpert systems (comprising 7553 modules) and >3 million Xpert MTB/RIF cartridges had been procured in 88 of the 145 countries under concessional pricing.

Using for COVID-19 testing
In August 2020, Vietnam Ministry of Health had approved the use of GeneXpert, that has been used in Vietnam tuberculosis prevention network since 2012, for COVID-19 testing. According to Nguyen Viet Nhung, director of the National Lung Hospital in Hanoi, the test is similar to RT-PCR, gives accurate results within 35–45 minutes for both COVID-19 and tuberculosis, and could work automatically. It is also used for COVID-19 testing at six sites across Somalia.

See also
Cepheid Inc. (the manufacturer)

References

External links
Frequently Asked Questions on Xpert MTB/RIF assay
VIDEO: CNN features use of Xpert MTB/RIF in Uganda
WHO Xpert technical and operational guide
WHO Roadmap for rolling out Xpert MTB/RIF for rapid diagnosis of TB and MDR-TB
Cepheid website on Xpert
Cepheid Announces European Release of First On-Demand Molecular Test for Simultaneous Detection of Mycobacterium tuberculosis (TB) and Resistance to Rifampicin

Medical tests